Stick Man is Tony Levin's sixth studio album published in 2007. The album showcases Levin's skills on the Chapman stick, as well as the electric bass and NS Upright bass. Most of the seventeen tracks are instrumental, though there are three songs with vocals by Levin. King Crimson bandmate Pat Mastelotto plays drums on eleven of the tracks.

Track listing
All compositions by Tony Levin.

"Welcome" - 4:12  	
"Gut String Theory" - 3:27 	
"Speedbump" - 2:48 	
"Slow Glide" - 4:00 	
"Shraag" - 4:25 	
"Not Just Another Pretty Bass" - 3:22 	
"El Mercado" - 2:27 	
"Orange Alert" - 2:32 	
"In her Locket" - 3:58
"Rising Waters" - 3:16
"Metro" - 4:21
"Zeros to Disk" - 3:23
"Sticky Fingers" - 2:27
"Rivers of Light" - 4:24
"Chop Shop" - 2:53
"The Gorgon Sisters Have a Chat" - 2:31
"Dark Blues" - 3:39

Personnel
Tony Levin - lead vocals, cello, bass guitar, Chapman stick, NS Upright bass, piano, keyboards
Chris Albers - acoustic guitar
Pat Mastelotto - drums & percussion
Scott Schorr - drums & percussion, keyboards, synthesizer
Tim Dow - drums

External links
 papabear.com (Tony Levin's website)

Tony Levin albums
2007 albums